Landricourt may refer to the following places in France:

 Landricourt, Aisne, a commune in the department of Aisne
 Landricourt, Marne, a commune in the department of Marne